Eric Lichtblau (born 1965) is an American journalist, reporting for The New York Times in the Washington bureau, as well as the Los Angeles Times, Time magazine, The New Yorker, and the CNN network's investigative news unit. He has earned two Pulitzer Prizes for his work. He received a Pulitzer Prize in 2006 with the New York Times for his reporting on warrantless wiretapping by the National Security Agency. He also was part of the New York Times team that won the Pulitzer in 2017 for coverage of Russia and the Trump campaign. He is the author of Bush's Law: The Remaking of American Justice, and The Nazis Next Door: How America Became a Safe Haven for Hitler's Men.

Life and career
Lichtblau was born to a Jewish family in Syracuse, New York, and graduated from Cornell University in 1987 with majors in government and English.  After college, Lichtblau served stints with the Los Angeles Times investigative team in Los Angeles and covered various law enforcement beats. He worked at the Los Angeles Times for 15 years, covering the Justice Department in their Washington bureau between 1999 and 2000.

Lichtblau joined The New York Times in September 2002 as a correspondent covering the Justice Department, and published his last story for the paper in April 2017. In that month he became an editor for CNN; just two months later, in June 2017, he was among three CNN editors who resigned following the retraction of a report regarding alleged contact between the presidential transition team of Donald Trump and a Russian state-owned bank.

Lichtblau and his wife Leslie Frances Zirkin (b. c. 1973) live in the Washington, D.C. area with their four children, including Matthew and Andrew Lichtblau.

Books
Lichtblau is the author of Bush's Law: The Remaking of American Justice. Lichtblau and fellow New York Times reporter James Risen were awarded a 2006 Pulitzer Prize.

In The Nazis Next Door: How America Became a Safe Haven for Hitler's Men, Lichtblau uncovered the full details of Operation Paperclip, a story that had been carefully guarded by the U.S. Central Intelligence Agency for over sixty years.  Unknown to Americans, and fully aware of the monstrous crimes many had committed, the CIA provided a safe haven for thousands of Nazi scientists and spies after World War II.  Most of the scientists recruited had worked on Hitler's V2 rocket project. The most well known of the Nazi scientists was Wernher Von Braun, often described as the "Father of Rocket Science".

The V2 rockets killed thousands of British and Belgian citizens during the War and its production effort ruthlessly exploited concentration camp prisoners for labor. CIA directors insisted America's dominance in space technology was far more important than prosecuting war criminals.  The CIA helped other Nazis gain access to the US to covertly collect information on Communists as part of an overzealous Cold War policy.  Elizabeth Holtzman described the book as a "fast paced, important book about the justice department's efforts to bring Nazi war criminals in the United States to justice that also uses recently declassified facts to expose the secret, reprehensible collaboration of U. S. intelligence agencies with those very Nazis". In both of his books, Lichtblau used first rate research to uncover what many would consider abuses of power by government agencies.

Lichtblau said in an interview that "Of all the survivors in the camps, only a few thousand came in the first year or so. A visa was a precious commodity, and there were immigration policymakers in Washington who were on record saying that they didn't think the Jews should be let in because they were 'lazy people' or 'entitled people' and they didn't want them in. But there were many, many thousands of Nazi collaborators who got visas to the U.S. while the survivors did not, even though they had been, for instance, the head of a Nazi concentration camp, the warden at a camp, or the secret police chief in Lithuania who signed the death warrants for people."

Controversy
On October 31, 2016, The New York Times published an article by Lichtblau and Steven Lee Myers indicating that intelligence agencies believed that Russian interference in the 2016 United States presidential election was not aimed at electing Republican presidential candidate Donald Trump. It was subsequently revealed that multiple United States intelligence agencies were conducting an investigation at the time into possible covert aid from the Kremlin to the Trump campaign. This led to criticism of Times''' coverage of the election, and speculation that the Times reporting, and the October 31 article in particular, contributed to Trump's victory. On January 20, 2017, the Times published an article by the public editor acknowledging that the Times staff, including the editors and Lichtblau, had access to materials and details indicating that the Russian interference was aimed at electing Trump, contradicting the October 31 article, and stating that "a strong case can be made that the Times was too timid in its decisions not to publish the material it had". Daniel Pfeiffer, former senior advisor to president Barack Obama, characterized the decision not to publish the story while at the same time publishing many articles that fueled the Hillary Clinton email controversy as a "black mark" in the newspaper's history. The New York Times editor Dean Baquet dismissed the controversy, stating that the public editor article is a "bad column" that comes to a "fairly ridiculous conclusion". It was later reported that in the editing of the piece, New York Times editors "downplayed what Lichtblau and Myers wanted to highlight" in the article and "cast the absence of a conclusion as the article's central theme rather than the fact of the investigation itself", which was "contrary to the wishes of the reporters."

In June 2017, Lichtblau resigned from CNN after an article about a Senate investigation into Russian Direct Investment Fund was retracted because it did not meet CNN’s editorial standards.

See also
Alfa-Bank

Works
2008: Bush's Law: The Remaking of American Justice (Pantheon)
2014: The Nazis Next Door: How America Became a Safe Haven for Hitler's Men'' (Houghton Mifflin Harcourt)

References

External links
Recent and archived news articles by Eric Lichtblau of The New York Times

1965 births
Living people
The New York Times writers
Cornell University alumni
Pulitzer Prize for National Reporting winners
People from DeWitt, New York
Jewish American journalists
21st-century American Jews